The Berrima River (in Victoria), also called the Berrima Creek (in New South Wales), is a perennial river of the Snowy River catchment, located in the Alpine region of the Australian states of New South Wales and Victoria.

Course and features
The Berrima River rises below the Berrima Range in a remote alpine wilderness area just north of the Black-Allan Line that forms part of the border between New South Wales and Victoria. The river flows generally south, before reaching its confluence with the Freestone Creek to form the Suggan Buggan River in the Shire of East Gippsland, within the Alpine National Park in Victoria. The river descends  over its  course.

Etymology
The word berrima is derived from the Aboriginal word meaning "to the south".

History

Aboriginal history
The traditional custodians of the land surrounding the Berrima River are the Australian Aboriginal Bidawal and Nindi-Ngudjam Ngarigu Monero peoples.

See also

 List of rivers of Australia

References

External links
 
 
 
 

East Gippsland catchment
Rivers of Gippsland (region)
Rivers of New South Wales
Snowy Mountains